Jesse or Isā Khān (died September 15, 1615), of the Bagrationi Dynasty, was a Safavid-appointed ruler of Kakheti in eastern Georgia from 1614 to 1615.

Jesse was a son of Prince George, himself a son of King Alexander II of Kakheti. Held as a political hostage by Abbas I of Persia, he was converted to Islam and brought up at the shah’s court in Isfahan. In 1614, when Abbas I’s armies overrun Kakheti, the king Teimuraz I had to flee to western Georgia (Kingdom of Imereti). Abbas appointed his loyal vassal, Isā Khān, as a governor of the region, but he failed to gain a foothold there. He was killed during an uprising against his rule. 

Jesse is not to be confused with his granduncle Prince Jesse of Kakheti, also known as Isā Khān.

References 

Suny, Ronald Grigor (1994), The Making of the Georgian Nation: 2nd edition. Indiana University Press, .
David Marshall Lang, The Last Years of the Georgian Monarchy, 1658-1832. New York: Columbia University Press, 1957.
 Вахушти Багратиони (Vakhushti Bagrationi) (1745). История царства грузинского. Возникновение и жизнь Кахети и Эрети. Ч.1. Accessed on October 25, 2007.

1615 deaths
Converts to Shia Islam from Eastern Orthodoxy
Former Georgian Orthodox Christians
Bagrationi dynasty of the Kingdom of Kakheti
Safavid governors of Kakheti
Shia Muslims from Georgia (country)
Iranian people of Georgian descent
People from Isfahan
Year of birth unknown
17th-century people of Safavid Iran